Naandi is a 1964 Kannada romantic drama film directed and written by N. Lakshminarayan, making his first venture in film direction. The film was produced by actor Vadiraj and Jawahar for Sri Bharathi Chitra studio house. The film starred Dr. Rajkumar and Harini along with Kalpana and Udaykumar playing guest roles. Actor Dinesh made his debut through this film in a supporting role.

The film, upon release garnered wide appreciation and recognition for capturing the real-time plights of those with hearing impairments  for the first time in commercial cinema. The film set a landmark by being the first ever Kannada film to be screened at an International film festival. This film was screened at IFFI 1992 Kannada cinema Retrospect. It is considered by one critic to be the first "offbeat" movie in Kannada cinema.

Cast

Soundtrack 
The music was composed by Vijaya Bhaskar with lyrics by R. N. Jayagopal. All the songs composed for the film were received extremely well and considered as evergreen songs.

References

External links 
 

1964 films
1960s Kannada-language films
Indian romantic drama films
Indian black-and-white films
Films about disability in India
Films scored by Vijaya Bhaskar
1964 directorial debut films
1964 romantic drama films
Films directed by N. Lakshminarayan